The Abbottabad women's cricket team is the women's representative cricket team for Abbottabad. They competed in the National Women's Cricket Championship between 2006–07 and 2017.

History
Abbottabad joined the National Women's Cricket Championship for its third season in 2006–07, losing both of their matches in Group C. The side went on to compete in every edition of the National Women's Cricket Championship until it ended in 2017, but never made it out of the group stages. Their most successful season came in 2007–08, when they won two of their three matches.

Players

Notable players
Players who played for Abbottabad and played internationally are listed below, in order of first international appearance (given in brackets):

 Qanita Jalil (2005)
 Nashra Sandhu (2017)
 Ayesha Naseem (2020)

Seasons

National Women's Cricket Championship

See also
 Abbottabad cricket team

References

Women's cricket teams in Pakistan